Scedella basilewskyi is a species of tephritid or fruit flies in the genus Scedella of the family Tephritidae.

Distribution
Rwanda.

References

Tephritinae
Insects described in 1956
Diptera of Africa